Christian Wörns (born 10 May 1972) is a German former professional footballer who played as a defender. Wörns is widely considered one of the finest German defenders of his generation. He started his career with Waldhof Mannheim but played the majority of his career with Bayer Leverkusen and Borussia Dortmund. He also had a short stint with Paris Saint-Germain.

Club career

Wörns was born in Mannheim. He made his professional debut in the Bundesliga at the young age of 17 years, 3 months and 30 days for Waldhof Mannheim and at the time, was the fourth youngest debutant ever. He played 18 games in his first season and 34 the next in the 2. Bundesliga.

The next year, he transferred to Bayer Leverkusen. Wörns quickly established himself as a defensive stalwart and anchored the strong Leverkusen defense for nearly a decade, together with sweeper Jens Nowotny and Markus Happe.

In 1998, he moved abroad to Paris Saint-Germain in France. He failed to settle in and after one season transferred to Borussia Dortmund. He continued to play at Borussia Dortmund until he retired in 2008.

International career
Wörns represented his country on 66 occasions and did not score.
Euro 1992: receives a runners-up (silver) medal as a backup squad member
Euro 1996: after an injury hit season, Wörns fails to get nominated and misses being on the winning squad.
World Cup 1998: Considered the best player on the German squad, Wörns played well for much of the tournament. However, in the quarter-final match against Croatia, he fouled Davor Šuker in the 40th minute to stop a possible breakaway run on goal, and received a straight red card from Norwegian referee Rune Pedersen. Three unanswered goals were scored against Germany after his sending off, making him the scapegoat for his country's 0–3 loss.
World Cup 2002: Does not play due to injury, but the team finishes the tournament as runners-up (silver).
Euro 2004: Germany is eliminated in the group stage after two draws and a loss.
When Germany manager Jürgen Klinsmann announced the 22 players for a friendly with Italy in Florence, in the lead-up to the 2006 FIFA World Cup, 34-year-old Wörns was only a backup squad member. This prompted an outrageous interview by Wörns. Because he verbally attacked Klinsmann during the interview, the German Football Association took disciplinary action against Wörns and banned from playing as an international. This was similar to what happened to Uli Stein (during the 1986 FIFA World Cup) and Stefan Effenberg (during the 1994 FIFA World Cup). The dropping of Wörns from the national team was roundly panned in Germany, as Italy routed Germany 4–1 in that exhibition game, and Klinsmann bore the brunt of the criticism as the team was ranked only 22nd in the world entering the 2006 FIFA World Cup. Germany ended up finishing the tournament in third place (bronze).

Managerial career

Wörns became manager of FC Augsburg II on 29 December 2015. He took over a team that won 16 points from 20 matches. His first match as manager came on 20 February 2016 in a 4–1 win against FC Ingolstadt 04 II. On 12 March 2016, Augsburg II lost 6–0 to SpVgg Unterhaching.

Career statistics

Club

International

Managerial record

Honours
Bayer Leverkusen
 DFB-Pokal: 1992–93

Paris Saint-Germain
 Trophée des Champions: 1998

Borussia Dortmund
 Bundesliga: 2001–02
 DFB-Pokal: runner-up 2007–08

Germany
 UEFA European Championship: runner-up 1992

Individual
 kicker Bundesliga Team of the Season: 1995–96, 1996–97, 1997–98, 2001–02

References

External links
Leverkusen who's who

1972 births
Living people
Association football defenders
German expatriate footballers
German expatriate sportspeople in France
German footballers
Germany international footballers
Germany under-21 international footballers
SV Waldhof Mannheim players
Bayer 04 Leverkusen players
Paris Saint-Germain F.C. players
Expatriate footballers in France
Borussia Dortmund players
1998 FIFA World Cup players
1999 FIFA Confederations Cup players
UEFA Euro 1992 players
UEFA Euro 2004 players
Bundesliga players
2. Bundesliga players
Ligue 1 players
Footballers from Mannheim
West German footballers